Zaltbommel, also known, historically and colloquially, as Bommel, is a municipality and a city in the Netherlands.

History

The city of Zaltbommel 
The town of Zaltbommel was first mentioned as "Bomela" in the year 850. Zaltbommel received city rights in 1231 and these were renewed in 1316. In 1599 during the Eighty Years War, Zaltbommel was besieged by Spanish forces but was relieved by an Anglo-Dutch force led by Maurice of Orange. The bridge over the Waal at Zaltbommel (which has since been replaced) features in a celebrated twentieth-century Dutch sonnet, De moeder de vrouw, by Martinus Nijhoff.

Zaltbommel was expanded to its current size on 1 January 1999, by a merger of the municipalities of Brakel, Kerkwijk and Zaltbommel. The municipality is situated in the heart of the Netherlands, close to the A2 Motorway, the railway line from Utrecht to 's‑Hertogenbosch and the rivers Waal and Maas.

Topography 

Dutch Topographic map of Zaltbommel (municipality), Sept. 2014

Population centres 

Notable residents

 Maarten van Rossum (ca.1478–1555) military tactician and commander
 Elbertus Leoninus (1519 or 1520 – 1598) jurist and statesman, helped negotiate the Pacification of Ghent
 Marigje Arriens (ca.1520–1591) an alleged Dutch witch
 Caspar Barlaeus (1584–1648) polymath and Renaissance humanist, a theologian, poet, and historian
 Andreas Essenius (1618–1677) Dutch Reformed theologian, controversialist and academic
 Jacob Abraham de Mist (1749–1823) statesman, Head of State of the National Assembly of the Batavian Republic
 Lion Philips (1794–1866) tobacco merchant, grandfather of Gerard and Anton Philips
 Sophie Pressburg (1797–1854), grandmother of Anton and Gerard Philips
 Hendrik Antonie Lodewijk Hamelberg (1826–1896), consul general and special envoy of the Orange Free State
 Gerard Philips (1858–1942), industrialist, co-founder of Philips Electronics
 Anton Philips (1874–1951), industrialist, co-founder of Philips Electronics
 Johannes van Maaren (1890–1963) wrestler, competed at the 1920, 1924 and 1928 Summer Olympics
 Anouchka van Miltenburg (born 1967) retired politician

The Arts 

 Lucas Vorsterman (1595–1675), Baroque engraver
 Warnard van Rijsen (1625–1670), a Dutch Golden Age painter. 
 Johannes Vorstermans (ca.1643– ca.1699/1719) Dutch Golden Age landscape painter.
 Gerard Hoet, (1648–1743) Dutch Golden Age painter 
 Jan Soukens (c.1650–c.1725) a Dutch Golden Age painter
 Suzanne Leenhoff (1829–1906), pianist, married Édouard Manet at Zaltbommel in 1863
 Peter van Anrooy (1879–1954) composer and conductor of classical music
 Fiep Westendorp (1916-2004), illustrator
 Thorwald Jørgensen (born 1980) classical musician, specialises in the theremin

Image gallery

References

External links 

  

 
Municipalities of Gelderland
Populated places in Gelderland